Claudia Augusta (January 63 – May 63) was the only daughter of the Roman Emperor Nero and his second wife, the Roman Empress Poppaea Sabina. Claudia and her mother were honored with the title of Augusta by Nero. She was born in Antium on 21 January 63 and later died five months after, of an unknown illness.

Nero and Poppaea Sabina mourned her death and Claudia was declared a goddess. Gold statues were placed in temples and circus games were held in Claudia's honor while a shrine and a priest were dedicated to her shortly afterward.

Ancestry

See also 
 Julio-Claudian family tree

References

 (edd.), Prosopographia Imperii Romani saeculi I, II et III, Berlin, 1933 – . (PIR2)

External links

 A Roman coin of Claudia Augusta can be seen at 

63 births
63 deaths
Claudii Nerones
1st-century Roman women
Deified Roman women
Augustae
Poppaea Sabina
Daughters of Roman emperors
Family of Nero
Julio-Claudian dynasty
Royalty who died as children